Raorchestes agasthyaensis, the Agasthiamalai bushfrog, is a frog found in the Western Ghats of Kerala, India, particularly in Bonacaud near Ponmudi as well as nearby areas of Thiruvananthapuram and Kollam districts. The species is named after Agasthyamalai, its type locality.

References

External links

agasthyaensis
Frogs of India
Endemic fauna of the Western Ghats
Amphibians described in 2011